Pornpipat Benyasri is a Thai General who served as the Chief of Defence Forces of the Royal Thai Armed Forces, following his appointment by King Vajiralongkorn in September 2018. He held various positions including as the commander of the National Defence College in 2006, became the Permanent Secretary of the Military Accounts in 2013, became the Deputy Chief of Staff, Royal Thai Armed Forces Headquarters in 2016, and became the Chief of Staff, Royal Thai Armed Forces Headquarters in 2017.

Education and careers 
Pornpipat study in primary and secondary at Suankularb Wittayalai School and then attending the Armed Forces Academies Preparatory School as a pre-cadet as a prerequisite for attending Chulachomklao Royal Military Academy (CRMA). After graduated in Military school, he studies at Command and General Staff College and National Defence College.

Pornpipat previously held a position of Commander of the Armed Forces Academies Preparatory School, Head of the Office of the Comptroller of the Royal Thai Armed Forces and Chief of Staff to the Royal Thai Armed Forces.

In Royal careers, he was a Committee on Project and Activities Commemoration on the auspicious occasion of the coronation of King Vajiralongkorn and Chairman of Subcommittee on Organizing of the Royal barge procession in 2019.

Honour 
received the following royal decorations in the Honours System of Thailand:

2017 -  Knight Grand Cordon of the Most Exalted Order of the White Elephant

2013 -  Knight Grand Cordon of the Most Noble Order of the Crown of Thailand

1987 -  Freeman Safeguarding Medal - 2nd Class 2nd Cat

1992 -  Border Service Medal

1995 -  Chakra Mala Medal

Foreign honour 

  :
2019 -  Commander of the Legion of Merit 

2019 -  The Most Gallant Order of Military Service

Darjah Kepahlawanan Angkatan Tentera Herald (B.A.T.)

References

Pornpipat Benyasri
Pornpipat Benyasri
Living people
1960 births
Pornpipat Benyasri